Al Wajiha is an Arabic drama, which was written by Asmahan Tawfik, directed by Saed Al Huwari and filmed in Kuwait. It originally aired for one season, or thirty episodes, on MBC1 and OSN Ya Hala! starting from December 15, 2014 and ending on March 3, 2014. The drama deals with a series of modern day social issues plaguing the Gulf society, and enters the homes of conservative Kuwaiti families. The show touches on a variety of relationship, mostly marital, problems that end up getting lost in the corridors of the courts. The dangers of having a secret marriage are revealed as the leading actress is left fighting for her legal rights while trying not to destroy her and her family’s reputation.

Plot 
Rashid and Maryam are a married couple who live together thanks to the medical help they have received from Dr. Amal in order to conceive their two children Yousef and Zeid. Dr. Amal’s closest friend Zeina, who was also a secretary working in Rashid’s office, lives with her sister Laila and her husband AbdulRahman. Zeina has secretly been married to Rashid for three years but when she accidentally becomes pregnant, Rashid threatens to abandon her if she does not have an abortion. Zeina decides to leave Rashid and have the baby in secret. Her sister Laila and brother in law AbdulRahman raise the baby girl and allow Zeina to name her Omniya, which means wish. Omniya grows up living a normal life, but when she gets to university and accidentally falls in love with her brother Zeid, who is battling cancer, her whole world turns upside down.

Characters 
Souad Abdullah portrays Maryam, a stay at home mother of two children, Zeid and Yousef, and wife of Rashid. Her character is powerful, aware and suspicious which only works out to her benefit in the end.

Ghazy Hussain portrays Rashid, a wealthy, well known and powerful businessman who is secretly married to Zeina. He is an irrational man who acts out of love and fear as he follows his heart rather than his brain. His character is selfish and will do anything in order to keep his pride and protect his reputation.

Zahra Arafat portrays Zeina, former secretary and secret wife of Rashid. A lifetime of avoiding being a part of a traditional household has forced her to be alone and miserable. Her secret marriage and the baby, Omniya, she could not raise as her own has left her regretting what she thought were the best three years of her life with Rashid.

Abeer Ahmed portrays Dr. Amal, Zeina’s closest friend. Her character is trustworthy and intelligent which is why everyone has been able to rely on her to keep their secrets throughout the season.

Ahmed Musaad portrays Abdulrahman, Zeina’s brother in law and wife of Laila. His character is responsible, reasonable, and cool tempered. He has a way with negotiating and helps support other characters as the situation worsens.

Shaima Ali portrays Leila, Zeina’s sister and wife of AbdulRahman. They are unable to naturally conceive a baby so they secretly adopt Omniya with the help of Dr. Amal. She is hot tempered and constantly worries about her family’s reputation along with the safety of her adopted daughter, Omniya.

Laila Abdullah portrays Omniya, Zeina and Rashids biological daughter who ends up falling in love with her biological brother, Zeid. Her character is strong and stubborn yet respectful and outgoing. She is determined to get her way without hurting those around her.

Issa Thiab portrays Zeid, Omniya’s biological brother turned love affair. His character is weak, emotional and only cares about his love for Omniya.

Hamad Ashnkany portrays Yousef, a young man who is yet to get his life in order, which upsets his father, Rashid, who believes marriage is the answer. Yousef disagrees until he meets and falls in love with Huda.

Amira Al Najdy portrays Huda, a young women to leaves Egypt after the death of her parents in search for a home in Rashid and Maryams house who are her only distant family after the tragic death of her parents.

Ghuroor portrays Nooryah, Rashid’s sister who lives in his home and helps take care of his family. Her character is aggressive but can be kind and caring towards her loved ones in difficult times.

AbdulRahman Al Aqel portrays Abu Abdullatif, Leila and AbdulRahman’s long time friend who is openly in love with Zeina. His character is calm, helpful, caring and emotional. He lives with his autistic son and hopes to marry Zeina in order to give his son a new mother after the passing of his first.

Mohamed Al Muslim portrays Abdullatif, an autistic young man who is secretly in love with Omniya and is skilled in playing the piano. He writes her many songs but she continues to acknowledge him as a brother rather than a possible love affair since they have grown up together. His character is irrational yet caring and helpful.

Kuwaiti television series
2010s drama television series
2014 Kuwaiti television series debuts
2014 Kuwaiti television series endings